A pitchfork (also a hay fork) is an agricultural tool with a long handle and two to five tines used to lift and pitch or throw loose material, such as hay, straw, manure, or leaves.

The term is also applied colloquially, but inaccurately, to the garden fork. While similar in appearance, the garden fork is shorter and stockier than the pitchfork, with three or four thicker tines intended for turning or loosening the soil of gardens.

Alternative terms
In some parts of England, a pitchfork is known as a prong. In parts of Ireland, the term sprong is used to refer specifically to a four-pronged pitchfork.

Description

The typical pitchfork consists of a wooden shaft bearing two to five slightly curved metal tines fixed to one end of a handle. These are typically made of steel, wrought iron, or some other alloy, though historically  wood or bamboo were used. Unlike a garden fork, a pitchfork lacks a grab at the end of its handle.

Pitchforks with few tines set far apart are typically used for bulky material such as hay or straw; those with more and more closely spaced are used for looser materials such as silage, manure, leaves, or compost.

History
In Europe, the pitchfork was first used in the Early Middle Ages, at about the same time as the harrow. These were made entirely of wood.

The pitchfork is occasionally employed as an improvised weapon, as in a mob or riot.

In popular culture

Artwork

Paintings by various artists depict a wide variety of pitchforks in use and at rest. A notable American work is American Gothic (1930) by Grant Wood, which features a three-pronged tool.

Politics

Because of its association with peasantry and farming, the pitchfork has been used as a populist symbol and appended as a nickname for certain leading populist figures, such as "Pitchfork" Ben Tillman and "Pitchfork" Pat Buchanan.

The Gangster Disciples, a street gang in the Midwestern United States, use a three-pointed pitchfork as one of their symbols.

Venezuelan far-right political party, New Order use three-pointed pitchforks as their symbol.

Religious symbolism
The pitchfork is often used in lieu of the visually similar weapon, the trident, in popular portrayals and satire of Christian demonology. Many humorous cartoons, both animated and otherwise, feature a caricature of a demon ostensibly wielding a "pitchfork" (often actually a trident) sitting on one shoulder of a protagonist, opposite an angel on the other.

The Hellenistic deity Hades wields a bident, a two-pronged weapon similar in form to a pitchfork but actually related to the trident in design and purpose.

See also
 Fork
 Garden fork
 Trident

References

Gardening tools
Farming tools
Blade weapons